Chloranthus is a genus of flowering plants in the family Chloranthaceae.

It is the type genus of its family.  They are perennial herbs or evergreen shrubs. with jointed stems, opposite, simple leaves, and small, inconspicuous flowers in slender, terminal spikes. They are found in countries of East Asia such as China, Japan, and Korea. China uses chloranthus plants for medical purposes.

Species  
 Chloranthus angustifolius
 Chloranthus anhuiensis
 Chloranthus elatior
 Chloranthus fortunei
 Chloranthus henryi
 Chloranthus holostegius
 Chloranthus japonicus
 Chloranthus multistachys
 Chloranthus nervosus
 Chloranthus oldhamii
 Chloranthus serratus
 Chloranthus sessilifolius
 Chloranthus spicatus
 Chloranthus tianmushanensis

References

1. Kong, H.-Z., Chen, Z.-D. & Lu, A.-M. (2002) Phylogeny of Chloranthus (Chloranthaceae) based on nuclear ribosomal ITS and plastid TRNL-F sequence data. American Journal of Botany 89(6): 940–946.

2.Li, Q, Y. Wang, S. Wen, Y. Wu, L. Xu, and Z. Sun. 2019. A New Dimeric Sesquiterpenoid from   
Chloranthus japonicus Sieb. A C G publication 13:483-490

External links
 

Chloranthaceae
Angiosperm genera
Taxa named by Olof Swartz